Alexander McKeachie Notman (born 10 December 1979) is a Scottish former professional footballer who played as a striker.

Club career
Born in Dalkeith, Notman began his career with Manchester United. He only made one substitute appearance for their first team against Tottenham Hotspur, and spent loan spells at Aberdeen and Sheffield United. He signed for Norwich City in November 2000 for a fee of £250,000. Notman retired from professional football in November 2003 due to injury.

He signed for non-league King's Lynn in January 2004; he left after one appearance before re-signing for the club in August 2006. He left the club again in March 2007, and signed for Wroxham in October 2007. A week later he signed for Boston United, before returning to Wroxham in December 2007. He signed for Formartine United in 2010.

International career
Notman was a Scotland under-21 international.

References

1979 births
Living people
People from Dalkeith
Scottish footballers
Manchester United F.C. players
Aberdeen F.C. players
Sheffield United F.C. players
Norwich City F.C. players
King's Lynn F.C. players
Wroxham F.C. players
Boston United F.C. players
Formartine United F.C. players
Scottish Premier League players
English Football League players
Highland Football League players
Association football forwards
Scotland under-21 international footballers
Sportspeople from Midlothian